The Altiplano chinchilla mouse or achallo (Chinchillula sahamae) is a species of rodent in the family Cricetidae.  It is the only species in the genus Chinchillula.
It is found in Argentina, Bolivia, Chile, and Peru.

References

Musser, G. G. and M. D. Carleton. 2005. Superfamily Muroidea. pp. 894–1531 in Mammal Species of the World a Taxonomic and Geographic Reference. D. E. Wilson and D. M. Reeder eds. Johns Hopkins University Press, Baltimore.

Phyllotini
Mammals of the Andes
Mammals of Argentina
Mammals of Bolivia
Mammals of Chile
Mammals of Peru
Mammals described in 1898
Taxa named by Oldfield Thomas
Taxonomy articles created by Polbot